The 2013 Boise State Broncos football team represented Boise State University in the 2013 NCAA Division I FBS football season. The Broncos were led by eighth year head coach Chris Petersen and played their home games at Bronco Stadium. They were members of the Mountain West Conference in the Mountain Division. They finished the season 8–5, 6–2 in Mountain West play to finish in second place in the West Division. They were invited to the Hawaii Bowl where they were defeated by Oregon State. The 5 losses matched the total of losses that the Broncos had posted in the five previous seasons combined.

On December 6, it was announced that head coach Chris Petersen would resign to take the head coaching job at Washington. In eight seasons at Boise State, he posted a record of 92–12, won five conference titles and two BCS games. Assistant head coach Bob Gregory served as Boise State's interim head coach in their bowl game. On December 11, The Broncos hired former offensive coordinator and Arkansas State head coach Bryan Harsin as their permanent head coach.

Conference shuffle
Boise State was originally set to join the Big East Conference, along with fellow Mountain West member San Diego State, for football in 2013; however, after the Big East announced a split between its FBS members (which eventually became the American Athletic Conference) and its non-FBS schools (which kept the Big East name), Boise State announced on December 31, 2012 that it would stay in the Mountain West Conference. San Diego State would later announce they would stay in the Mountain West as well, making the Mountain West a 12 team conference. The Mountain West formed divisions for the first time, with Boise State as part of the Mountain Division, and will conduct a conference championship game for the first time.

As part of the conditions for Boise State to stay in the conference, the Mountain West lifted the ban on the Broncos wearing their all blue uniforms at home during conference games.

Schedule

Game summaries

at Washington

This was the second consecutive meeting between the Broncos and the Huskies as they met at the end of the 2012 season in the Maaco Bowl Las Vegas. The 32-point loss is the worst loss under Chris Petersen. The previous highest margin of defeat was 14, also coming against Washington in 2007, Petersen's second year as head coach. Prior to this game, the Broncos' previous five losses had been by a combined 11 points. It was the Broncos worst loss since a 35-point loss to Georgia to open the 2005 season. This was also the first time the Broncos failed to score a touchdown since a 58–0 loss to Washington State in 1997.

UT Martin

Air Force

Quarterback Joe Southwick set a Boise State and Mountain West record for completion percentage completing 27 of 29 passes (93.1%). The Broncos were allowed to wear their all blue uniforms for the first time during a home conference game since joining the Mountain West in 2011.

at Fresno State

Southern Miss

at Utah State

Utah State chose to wear white at home. The win was the Broncos 21st straight win over a team from Utah with the last loss coming in 1997.

Nevada

at BYU

The loss to BYU ended a 21-game winning streak against teams from the state of Utah dating back to a 1997 loss to Utah State. It was also the Broncos first loss in the month of October since a loss to Rice in 2001, a span of 50 wins.

at Colorado State

Wyoming

at San Diego State

This loss marked the first time that Boise State lost to the same opponent in consecutive years since losing to Washington State in 2000 and 2001.

New Mexico

Oregon State (Hawaii Bowl)

Rankings

Statistics

Scores by quarter

References

Boise State
Boise State Broncos football seasons
Boise State Broncos football